Rural Bank of Cauayan, Inc. or commonly known as RB Cauayan, is a rural bank established on April 7, 1965 in Cauayan, Isabela, Philippines. It was founded by Ireneo Bucag, Sr. and his wife Juana Bucag together with four other incorporators.

It offers diverse loan products between and among: farmers, fishers and their organizations; micro, small and medium entrepreneurs; and professionals, pensioners and other under served segments of the market.

As of 2018, Rural Bank of Cauayan has a total of 19 branches and one extension office operating in four provinces in Cagayan Valley – Isabela, Cagayan, Quirino and Nueva Vizcaya.

References

Banks of the Philippines
Banks established in 1965
Philippine companies established in 1965